Finneas Baird O'Connell (born July 30, 1997), known mononymously as Finneas (stylized in all caps), is an American singer-songwriter, record producer, and actor. He has written and produced music for various artists, most notably his sister, Billie Eilish. He has won eight Grammy Awards among 13 total nominations, including nominations for the Big Four categories. He has made history as the youngest act to win the Producer of the Year, Non-Classical category. For his work with Eilish, he has won Record of the Year twice in a row, Album of the Year, Song of the Year, Best Pop Vocal Album, and Best Engineered Album, Non-Classical. He was also nominated for Best New Artist for his solo work. Their song "No Time to Die" from the film of the same name earned him an Academy Award, a Golden Globe and another Grammy.

Finneas has released several singles as a solo artist, and his debut EP, Blood Harmony, was released in October 2019. The EP includes "Let's Fall in Love for the Night", his most successful song to date, peaking at number 17 on the US Billboard Alternative Songs chart. His debut studio album Optimist was released through Interscope Records in October 2021.

Finneas starred in the 2013 independent film Life Inside Out. He is also known for his role as Alistair in the Fox musical comedy-drama series Glee. He has also made an appearance on the American sitcom Modern Family.

Early life

Finneas was born in Los Angeles to actress and screenwriter Maggie Baird and actor Patrick O'Connell, both of whom are also musicians. Finneas is of Irish and Scottish descent. In 2010, at age 12, he took a songwriting class with his mother, and began writing and producing songs.

Career

Songwriting and producing
Finneas has said his experience playing characters helped with writing music for his sister Billie Eilish, because he writes from her perspective and for her vocal range. He stated: "Being able to hear an artist and emulate them has been a huge part of being successful as a producer and co-writer". When he writes for his sister, he wants to "write a song that I think she'll relate to and enjoy singing and empathise with the lyrics and make her own", and when he writes with her he tries to "help her tell whatever story she's trying to tell, bounce ideas off of her, listen to her ideas." 

Finneas had written and produced his song "Ocean Eyes" originally for his band, and gave it to Eilish when her dance teacher asked them to write a song for a choreography. They posted the song on SoundCloud, garnering praise from various websites. Finneas's manager reached out to him in November 2015 to talk about Eilish's potential. Finneas then helped Eilish sign to the A&R company Platoon. He co-wrote and produced Eilish's debut EP Don't Smile at Me (2017), which peaked at number 14 on the US Billboard 200. Finneas also co-wrote and produced Eilish's debut studio album, When We All Fall Asleep, Where Do We Go? (2019), which debuted atop the US and UK charts. He won the 2020 Grammy Awards for Producer of the Year, Non-Classical; Record of the Year and Song of the Year for Eilish's "Bad Guy"; and Album of the Year and Best Engineered Album, Non-Classical for When We All Fall Asleep, Where Do We Go?

He has also been known to work with Grammy winners the Coutinho twins. He produced the 2019 single "Lose You to Love Me" by Selena Gomez, which peaked at number one on the Billboard Hot 100, and two tracks on the 2019 album Romance by Camila Cabello. He also produced "Moral of the Story" by Ashe, and collaborated with John Legend on an unreleased song. O'Connell composed the score for the 2021 teen drama film The Fallout.

Solo music career

He is the lead singer and songwriter of the band The Slightlys, which played the Warped Tour in 2015. His first solo single, "New Girl", was released in 2016, with the music video released in 2019. In 2017, he released the single "I'm in Love Without You", and eight singles in 2018: "Break My Heart Again", "Heaven", "Life Moves On", "Landmine", "Hollywood Forever", "College", "Luck Pusher", and "Let's Fall in Love for the Night". In early 2019, Finneas played his first sold-out headline shows in New York and Los Angeles.

His debut EP, Blood Harmony, was released on October 4, 2019. The EP's first single, "I Lost a Friend", was released on June 25, 2019, while the second single, "Shelter", was released on August 22, 2019, and the third single, "I Don't Miss You At All", on September 20, 2019. In October 2019, he embarked on his first headlining tour, in five cities in the US, in addition to a performance at Austin City Limits.

On August 7, 2020, he released a surprise deluxe version of Blood Harmony, featuring two new tracks, "Break My Heart Again" and "Let's Fall in Love for the Night (1964)", the latter being an alternate version of the sixth track, "Let's Fall in Love for the Night". About two weeks later, O'Connell released a single titled "What They'll Say About Us". It peaked at number 17 on the US Billboard Alternative Songs chart. On October 21, Finneas released his single "Can't Wait to Be Dead" about his love-hate relationship with the Internet, along with a visual directed by Constellation Jones the following day.

Finneas is one of 12 artists featured on Ringo Starr's 2021 EP Zoom In, contributing backing vocals to the song "Here's to the Nights". On March 2, 2021, Finneas and Ashe released a collaboration titled "Till Forever Falls Apart", which he co-wrote and produced.

On August 5, 2021, Finneas announced that his debut studio album Optimist would be released on October 15, 2021 through Interscope Records, and shared its lead single "A Concert Six Months from Now". He also composed the scores to the films The Fallout (2021), and Vengeance (2022).

Acting
In 2011, Finneas played a student in the comedy film Bad Teacher. In 2013, he co-starred in Life Inside Out, written by and starring his mother Maggie Baird and directed by Jill D'Agnenica. He had recurring guest roles on Modern Family and Aquarius, and played Alistair in the final season of the musical comedy-drama television series Glee in 2015.

Personal life 
Finneas is based in Los Angeles. He has been in a relationship with YouTuber Claudia Sulewski since September 2018. His single "Claudia" was written after the night they met.

He was raised vegetarian, before then becoming vegan.

Discography

Studio albums
Optimist (2021)

Extended plays
Blood Harmony (2019)

Soundtrack albums
 The Fallout (2021)
 Vengeance (2022)

Tours
Headlining tours
Optimist Tour (2021)

Filmography

Awards and nominations

Notes

References

External links

 
1997 births
Living people
21st-century American male actors
21st-century American male singers
21st-century American singers
American agnostics
American male film actors
American male television actors
American people of Irish descent
American people of Scottish descent
Best Original Song Academy Award-winning songwriters
California Democrats
Billie Eilish
Golden Globe Award-winning musicians
Grammy Award winners
Male actors from California
Record producers from Los Angeles
Singers from Los Angeles
Singer-songwriters from California